Jesus the Greatest Name Christian College (JGNCC) is an educational institution in San Jose del Monte, Bulacan. Established in 2003 by Mr. and Mrs. Pedro Maguad, the school population (comprising Pre-elementary, Elementary, and High School pupils and students) has grown to its present size of 285.

True to its identity as a Christian school, it also serves as the Pleasant Hills Cell Church of Jesus Christ the Savior International Assemblies (JCSIA). Worship service is held every Sunday at 9 am.

Philosophy
"Train a child the way he should go, and when he is old, he will not depart from it." Proverbs 22:6

Scholarships
JGNCC has been awarded 46 Educational Service Contracting (ESC) scholarships by the Fund for Assistance to Private Education in July 2008. The program grants five thousand-peso tuition and school fees subsidy to graduates from public elementary schools. Grantees enjoy the scholarship for their entire stay in high school provided that they do not incur failing marks and/or disciplinary violations.

References
 https://web.archive.org/web/20081014070003/http://educationforum.org.nz/documents/publications/contracting_education.pdf
 http://www.manilastandardtoday.com/?page=sports01_aug28_2006

Specific

Schools in Bulacan
Education in San Jose del Monte
Protestant schools in the Philippines
Educational institutions established in 2003
2003 establishments in the Philippines